Dumas (born Steve Dumas) is a Canadian musician a from Victoriaville, Quebec.

Career
Dumas released his first album Dumas in 2001, when he was 21. His second album, Le cours des jours, made him more well-known. The album includes contributions from Marie-Annick Lépine from the group Les Cowboys Fringants on two songs. In 2004, Carl Bastien and Dumas released the soundtrack to the film Les Aimants by Yves P. Pelletier.

Dumas' 2012 album L'heure et l'endroit debuted at number 11 on the Canadian Albums Chart.

Dumas has also produced and written music for other artists, as well as composing music for films. He wrote the theme song for Ça sent la coupe and Love and Magnets, for which he won an IRIS and a Felix Award.

Additionally, he has contributed vocals to several commercials and TV shows, while also collaborating in some of them as a columnist.

In February 2018, Dumas released Nos idéaux and launched a solo tour of Quebec and Europe.

He published Cosmologie, his twelfth full-length studio album, in January 2023.

Discography
 Dumas (2001)
 Le cours des jours (2003)
 Ferme la radio (EP, 2004)
 Les Aimants en musique (Collaboration with Carl Bastien, soundtrack from the film Love and Magnets – 2004)
 Fixer le temps (2006)
 Nord (2008)
 Rouge (2009)
 Demain (2009)
 Au bout du monde (2009)
 Traces (2009)
 L'heure et l'endroit (2012)
 Dumas (2014)
 Un jours sur Mars (2016)
 Nos idéaux (2018)
 Cosmologie (2023)

Awards and recognition

 2005 – Prix Rapsat-Lelièvre
 2005 – Jutra Award best music for the film Love and Magnets (Les Aimants)
 2005 – Félix Award – Spectacle of the year – Author-composer-interpreter for Dumas en solo
 2005 – Félix Award – Album of the year – Original soundtrack for Les Aimants en musique

References

External links
 

Canadian pop singers
Singers from Quebec
1979 births
Living people
People from Victoriaville
Canadian singer-songwriters
21st-century Canadian male singers
Canadian male singer-songwriters